The Wasson House is a historic house on Main Street in Springtown, Arkansas.  It is a well-preserved example of an I-house, built c. 1890.  It is five bays wide, with a side gable roof, and a two-story porch, supported by Tuscan columns, extending across the center three bays, with a latticework balustrade at the second level.  A two-story ell extends to the rear, and there is a period brick combination well house/smoke house nearby.  Both the interior and exterior retain significant original woodwork and other design elements.

The house was listed on the National Register of Historic Places in 1988.

See also
National Register of Historic Places listings in Benton County, Arkansas

References

Houses on the National Register of Historic Places in Arkansas
Houses completed in 1890
Houses in Benton County, Arkansas
National Register of Historic Places in Benton County, Arkansas